is a 1989 remake of the 1971 classic anime series The Adventures of Hutch the Honeybee.

The show follows the original series' main storyline, and tells the adventure of a young bee who searches for his missing queen bee mother. Like the 1970 show, this remake is notable for its sad and cruel scripts, often featuring the deaths of the protagonist's friends.

Cast
Hitomi Ishikawa as Hutch
Atsuko Mine as Honey
Masako Nozawa as Kumagoro
Michiko Nomura as Aya
Rei Sakuma as Roza
Ryūji Saikachi as Old Man Osamushi
Toshiko Maeda as Narrator
Yoshiko Sakakibara as Mam

Episodes

Foreign versions
In France, whereas the original series had been broadcast under the title Le Petit Prince Orphelin (the Little Orphan Prince), this remake was broadcast on France 3 under the titles of Hacou l'abeille (Hacou the bee), or simply Hacou with only 26 of the 55 episodes being shown. 

In Italy, the series was broadcast on Italia 1. Only 4 of the 55 episodes were aired

In the Middle East, the anime was dubbed in Jordan under the title of Arabic: Siwar Al-Asal. However, the Arabic dubbing was limited to dubbing the first 26 episodes of the series, and did not complete the rest.

References

External links
 

1989 anime television series debuts
Japanese children's animated adventure television series
Nippon TV original programming
Tatsunoko Production
Animated television series about insects
Animated television series about orphans